Charles Cist may refer to:

 Charles Cist (printer) (1738–1805), United States printer
 Charles Cist (editor) (1792–1868), United States editor